David Ian Bell,  OAM (born 11 March 1955 in Melbourne) is a retired field hockey player from Australia, who was part of the team that won the silver medal at the 1976 Summer Olympics in Montreal, Quebec, Canada.

He attended Aquinas College, Perth.

Bell was first selected for Western Australia in 1974 and was a member of the Australia that won a silver medal at 1976 Montreal Olympics. The Australian hockey team boycotted the 1980 Summer Olympics. The Australian team finished fourth at the 1984 Summer Olympics. He captained the Australian team that won the 1986 Hockey World Cup.

He was the head coach of the Australia women's national field hockey team and the Australian Institute of Sport women's program  from 2001 to 2004. Major coaching results were:
2001: 3rd – Champions Trophy
2002: 4th – World Cup ; 4th – Champions Trophy ; 3rd – Commonwealth Games
2003: 1st – Champions Trophy
2004: 5th – Athens Olympics

Recognition
1987 – Medal of the Order of Australia in 1987 for his services to hockey
1997 – inducted into WA Hall of Champions
2004 – inducted into the Sport Australia Hall of Fame.
2008 – inducted into Hockey Australia Hall of Fame

References

External links
 
 
 
 

1955 births
Living people
Australian field hockey coaches
Australian Institute of Sport coaches
Australian male field hockey players
Field hockey players at the 1976 Summer Olympics
Field hockey players at the 1984 Summer Olympics
Medalists at the 1976 Summer Olympics
Olympic field hockey players of Australia
Olympic medalists in field hockey
Olympic silver medalists for Australia
People educated at Aquinas College, Perth
Recipients of the Medal of the Order of Australia
Field hockey players from Melbourne
Field hockey players from Perth, Western Australia
Sport Australia Hall of Fame inductees
Australian Olympic coaches